"Parachute" is a song by Swedish DJ and music producer Otto Knows. The song was released as a digital download in June 2014 through Refune Music. The song was written by Otto Knows and Simon Strömstedt. The song peaked to number 27 on the Swedish Singles Chart and also charted in Germany and the Netherlands.

Music video
A music video to accompany the release of "Parachute" was first released onto YouTube on 3 June 2014 at a total length of three minutes and forty-two seconds. It has received more than 3.2 million views as of March 2016.

Track listing

Chart performance

Weekly charts

Release history

References

2014 songs
Otto Knows songs